Amanda Vincent is a Canadian marine biologist and conservationist, one of the world's leading experts on seahorses and their relatives. She currently holds the chair of the IUCN SSC Seahorse, Pipefish and Seadragon Specialist Group and is the marine representative on the IUCN's International Red List Committee as well as being the chair of its Marine Conservation Committee. She previously held the Canada Research Chair in Marine Conservation at the UBC Institute for the Oceans and Fisheries at the University of British Columbia (UBC), Canada from 2002 to 2012. Vincent co-founded and directs Project Seahorse, an interdisciplinary and international organization committed to conservation and sustainable use of the world's coastal marine ecosystems. In 2020 she became the first marine conservationist to win the world's leading prize for animal conservation, the Indianapolis Prize.

Education 

Vincent received a B.Sc. (Hons.) from the University of Western Ontario in Canada, and a Ph.D. from the University of Cambridge, England. She was a visiting fellow in Sweden and Germany (1990–1991) and a senior research fellow at the University of Oxford, England (1991–1996). She was a faculty member at McGill University from 1996 to 2002. She held the Canada Research Chair in Marine Conservation at the Fisheries Centre at the University of British Columbia, Canada (2002-2012).  She is currently full professor at the Institute for the Oceans and Fisheries, UBC.

Project Seahorse 

In 1996, Vincent co-founded and still directs Project Seahorse, a marine conservation organization based at UBC, Canada, and Zoological Society of London, UK. Project Seahorse generates cutting-edge research and uses it for highly effective conservation interventions in fisheries, protected areas, trade and policy. Project Seahorse collaborates with researchers, governments, conservation groups, industry and local communities worldwide to ensure the conservation and sustainable use of the world's coastal marine ecosystems.

Research 

Vincent has written many scientific papers, technical reports, popular articles and policy briefings. She published the first monograph on the international trade in seahorses in 1996 and then co-authored a book on seahorse identification in 1999. Her work has been documented in five full-length television programmes, and other media coverage globally. Her background includes extensive rough travel through more than 60 countries.

Her research interests include:

International conservation policy
Trade in marine life for non-food purposes (e.g. medicine, aquarium pets, and curios)
Seahorses, pipefishes, pegasid fishes
Regulation of trawling and bycatch
Marine protected areas and zoning
Community-based coastal resource management, particularly in Southeast Asia
Small-scale fisheries management, with a particular attention to gender issues
Marine trade assessment and policy development
Reproductive ecology of fishes and other marine organisms, and its evolution

Vincent was the first person to study seahorses underwater, the first to document the extensive trade in these fishes, and the first to initiate a seahorse conservation project. Her work has received many awards and commendations. Vincent is consulted on marine management and policy issues.  She is chair of the IUCN SSC Seahorse, Pipefish and Seadragon Group. She is the marine representative on the IUCN's International Red List Committee and is the chair of its Marine Conservation Committee. From 2000 to 2004, she chaired the Syngnathid Working Group for the 182-nation Convention on the International Trade in Endangered Species (CITES). Project Seahorse played a pivotal role in the landmark CITES decision to begin regulating international trade in marine fishes.  In addition, Vincent has held special responsibility for coastal species as a member of the steering committee of the IUCN Species Survival Commission.

Selected publications 
Foster, S.J., Justason, T.A., Magera, A., & A.C.J. Vincent. 2022. CITES makes a measurable difference to the trade in live marine fishes: the pioneering case of seahorses. Conservation Biology, 272, 109653. https://doi.org/10.1016/j.biocon.2022.109653
Pollom, R.A., Ralph, G.M., Pollock, C. M., & A.C.J. Vincent. 2021. Global extinction risk for seahorses, pipefishes and their near relatives (Syngnathiformes). Oryx, 55(4):497-506.  https://doi.org/10.1017/S0030605320000782
Vaidyanathan, T. & A.C.J. Vincent. 2021. Status of India’s seahorse fisheries two decades after it was banned. Biodiversity and Conservation, 30:2223–2253. https://doi.org/10.1007/s10531-021-02188-6.
Foster, S.J. & A.C.J. Vincent. 2021. Holding governments accountable for their commitments: CITES Review of Significant Trade for a very high-volume taxon. Global Ecology and Conservation, 27:e01572. https://doi.org/10.1016/j.gecco.2021.e01572
Vaidyanathan, T., Zhang, X., Balakrishnan, R., & A.C.J. Vincent. 2021. Catch and trade bans for seahorses can be negated by non‐selective fisheries. Aquatic Conservation: Marine and Freshwater Ecosystems, 31(1):43-59. https://doi.org/10.1002/aqc.3419
Zhang, X. & A.C.J. Vincent. 2020. China’s policies on bottom trawl fisheries over seven decades (1949–2018). Marine Policy, 119:104062. https://doi.org/10.1016/j.marpol.2020.104256
Aylesworth, L., Foster, S. J. & A.C.J. Vincent 2020. Realities of offering advice to governments on CITES. Conservation Biology, 34(3):644-653. https://doi.org/10.1111/cobi.13451
Foster, S.J., Kuo, T-C., Wan, A.K.Y. & A.C.J. Vincent 2019. Global seahorse trade defies export bans under CITES action and national legislation. Marine Policy 103: 33-41. https://doi.org/10.1016/j.marpol.2019.01.014
Gillespie, K.M. and A.C.J. Vincent. 2019. Marine reserves drive both taxonomic and functional change in coral reef invertebrate communities. Biodiversity and Conservation 28(4):921–938. https://doi.org/10.1007/s10531-019-01702-1
Zhang, X. and A.C.J. Vincent. 2018. Predicting distributions, habitat preferences and associated conservation implications for a genus of rare fishes, seahorses. Diversity and Distributions 24(7):1005-1017. https://doi.org/10.1111/ddi.127
Lawson J.M., S.J. Foster and A.C.J. Vincent. 2017. Low bycatch rates add up to big numbers for a genus of small fishes. Fisheries 42(1):19-33. https://doi.org/10.1080/03632415.2017.1259944 
Cisneros-Montemayor, A. and A.C.J. Vincent. 2016. Science, society, and flagship species: social and political history as keys to conservation outcomes in the Gulf of California. Ecology and Society 21(2). http://dx.doi.org/10.5751/ES-08255-210209
Vincent, A.C.J., and J.M. Harris. 2014. Boundless no more. Science 346.6208: 420–421.
Vincent, A.C.J., Sadovy,Y.J., Fowler, S.L and S. Lieberman. 2013. The role of CITES in the conservation of marine fishes subject to international trade. Fish and Fisheries 15: 563–592. https://doi.org/10.1111/faf.12035
Vincent, A.C.J., Giles, B.G., Czembor, C.A., Foster, S.F.  2011. Trade in Seahorses and Other Syngnathids in Countries Outside Asia (1998–2001).
Vincent, A.C.J., Foster, S.J., Koldewey, H.J.  2011.  Conservation and management of seahorses and other Syngnathidae. Journal of Fish Biology. 78(6):1681-1724. https://doi.org/10.1111/j.1095-8649.2011.03003.x
Vincent, A.C.J.  2008.  Keynote: Reconciling fisheries with conservation on coral reefs: the world as an onion. Reconciling fisheries with conservation: Fourth World Fisheries Congress. 49:1435–1467.
Vincent, A.C.J., Meeuwig, J., Pajaro, M., Perante, N.  2007.  Characterizing a small-scale, data-poor, artisanal fishery: Seahorses in the central Philippines. Fisheries Research. 86(2-3):207-215. https://doi.org/10.1016/j.fishres.2007.06.006
Vincent, A.C.J., Marsden, A.D., Sumaila, U.R..  2007.  The role of globalization in creating and addressing seahorse conservation problems. Globalization: Effects on Fisheries Resources. Cambridge University Press. pp. 184-214.
Vincent, A.C.J. 2006.  Live food and non-food fisheries on coral reefs, and their potential for management. Coral Reef Conservation. Cambridge University Press, Cambridge, UK. pp. 183-236.
Vincent, A.C.J., Sadovy, Y.J.  1998.  Reproductive ecology in the conservation and management of fishes. Behavioural Ecology and Conservation Biology pp. 209-245.
All publications by Amanda Vincent (1998-present)

Awards and honours 
Dawkins Prize for Conservation & Animal Welfare (2023)
Fellow of the Royal Society of Canada (2020)
Winner, Indianapolis Prize for Animal Conservation (2020)
Le Cren Medal (2018)
A global finalist for the Indianapolis Prize for Animal Conservation (2010, 2016)
Yves Rocher Foundation Woman of the Earth (2007)
Chevron Conservation Award (2005)
Pew Fellow in Marine Conservation (2000)
William Dawson Scholar (2000)
La Presse Personality of the Year (2000)
Time magazine Leader for the 21st Century (1999)
Whitley Award in Animal Conservation (1994)
Rolex Award for Enterprise (1998)
Grand Prix International pour l'Environment Marin (Conféderation Mondiale des Activités Subaquatiques: 1997)

Taxon named in her honor 
Leptonotus vincentae, is a species of pipefish found in the Ocean.

References

External links 

Amanda Vincent profile (Project Seahorse)
Amanda Vincent profile (Indianapolis Prize)
"Leaders in Conservation named finalists for $100,000 award to help animals"

Living people
Canadian marine biologists
Academic staff of the University of British Columbia
Canada Research Chairs
University of Western Ontario alumni
Alumni of the University of Cambridge
Academic staff of McGill University
Year of birth missing (living people)